Southwestern Ontario is a secondary region of Southern Ontario in the Canadian province of Ontario. It occupies most of the Ontario Peninsula bounded by Lake Huron, including Georgian Bay, to the north and northwest; the St. Clair River, Lake St. Clair, and Detroit River, to the west; and Lake Erie to the south.  To the east, on land, Southwestern Ontario is bounded by Central Ontario and the Golden Horseshoe. The region had a population of 2,583,544 in 2016. It is sometimes further divided into "Midwestern Ontario" covering the eastern half of the area and the heart of Southwestern Ontario encompassing the western half of the region.

Definitions

The Government of Ontario also classifies municipalities along the eastern side of Southwestern Ontario near the Grand River, including Wellington County (containing Guelph), the Region of Waterloo (containing Kitchener, Waterloo, and Cambridge), and Brant County (containing Brantford), as part the "Greater Golden Horseshoe" region that surrounds western Lake Ontario. Some non-profit organizations, government bodies, and news organizations also classify a larger swath of the eastern side of Southwestern Ontario (the area from Huron County, Bruce County, and Grey County in the north, southward through Dufferin County, Wellington County, the Region of Waterloo, Perth County, and Oxford County, and sometimes south to Brant County and Norfolk County on Lake Erie) as being "Midwestern Ontario." This thereby places only the counties southwest of this in their definition of Southwestern Ontario, although in some cases Perth County is also grouped in Southwestern Ontario.

History
Archaeological findings from the Princess Point Complex suggest that indigenous peoples grew maize in the region as early as 260 CE. Iroquoians are recognizable from 500 CE, and by 900 CE longhouse villages began appearing near modern-day Brantford.

Europeans settlement began in the early 18th century, when it was part of the Royal Province of New France. One of the oldest continuous settlements in the region is Windsor, which originated as a southerly extension of the settlement of Fort Detroit in 1701. With the transfer of New France to British control in 1763, the region was part of the British Province of Quebec, 1774 to 1791; the Province of Upper Canada, 1791 to 1841; and the Canada West division of the Province of United Canada, 1841 to Confederation in 1867, when United Canada was formally partitioned into the provinces of Ontario and Quebec.

During the 19th century and early 20th century, the largest city in Southwestern Ontario was Windsor; however, as both cities grew, Windsor was outpaced by the faster growth of London, and passed the mantle of regional anchor to that city in the 1960s. Late in the 20th century the Kitchener–Cambridge–Waterloo metropolitan area became the most populous metropolitan area in southwestern Ontario surpassing the London-St. Thomas metropolitan area, and serves as the anchor of Midwestern Ontario.

Southwestern Ontario is a prosperous agricultural region whose chief crops are tobacco, sweet corn, soybean, winter wheat, canola, and tomatoes. Dairy and beef farming, breeding and training of standardbred horses and wine growing and production are also important industries. Its climate is among the mildest in Canada. Although brief periods of winter can be severe, summers are hot and humid with a longer growing season than in most of the country.

A large section of Southwestern Ontario was part of the Talbot Settlement, and the region has benefited from the settlement’s facilitation of agriculture and of trade in general. Its economy is heavily tied in with that of the midwestern United States, in particular the border state of Michigan. Auto manufacturing and parts, agriculture and hi-tech industries are key components of the region’s economy. The region also provides important transportation routes for commercial trucking, railway and tanker shipping from Detroit-Windsor and Port Huron, Michigan-Sarnia linking Canada with major markets in the eastern and midwestern United States.

Today the largest cities in Southwestern Ontario, in order of population (2016), are: London, Kitchener, Windsor, Guelph, Cambridge, Waterloo, Brantford, Sarnia, Woodstock, St. Thomas, Leamington, and Stratford. Chatham is also a major population centre, but is not an independent municipality and is part of Chatham-Kent.

Weather and climate
Like other parts of southern Canada, the region brings warm or hot summers with normal thunderstorm occurrences. Some of these storms are severe, with damaging winds, hail and tornadoes all possible during peak season, May through September. The most likely areas for these kinds of weather events is within the Windsor - London corridor and north up to about Huron County. Winters are cold with less snowfall in the south towards Essex County and higher amounts north towards Bruce County. London receives approximately 30% more snowfall than Windsor, owing to its relative position to Lake Huron and the resulting snowbelt in Bruce and Middlesex counties.

Under the Köppen climate classification, much of this area has a humid continental climate (Köppen Dfa/Dfb borderline).

Infrastructure

The southern portion of Southewestern Ontario is the most populated and industrialized section of the region. The southern portion is bisected by Highway 401 which runs through Windsor and past London to Woodstock and Waterloo-Wellington region. Highway 402 runs from London to Sarnia.

The region is also serviced by major ports in Goderich on Lake Huron, Windsor on Lake Erie and just to the east Hamilton on Lake Ontario which is major destination for regionally produced grain.

Windsor, London and Kitchener-Waterloo also have significant regional airports with some international flights.

Dialect
The accent in the region, Southwestern Ontario English, is distinct from the rest of Ontario.

Subdivisions

Single-tier municipalities
County of Brant 
Chatham-Kent
Haldimand County
Norfolk County

Separated municipalities
City of Brantford
City of Guelph
City of London
City of Owen Sound
Pelee Township
City of Sarnia
Town of St. Marys
City of St. Thomas
City of Stratford
City of Windsor
City of Woodstock
Town of Tillsonburg

Regional municipalities
Oxford County  
Waterloo Region

Counties
Bruce County
Dufferin County (partially extended)
Elgin County
Essex County
Grey County
Huron County
Lambton County
Middlesex County
Perth County
Wellington County

References

 
Geographic regions of Ontario